The St. Kabir Institute of Professional Studies is a business school located in Ahmedabad in the state of Gujarat, India. It offers a two-year full-time post-graduate diploma in management. The institute has held All India Council for Technical Education accreditation since 2008.

History
The institute was established in 2008 with an enrollment of 60 students. In 2015, the intake was 120.

Academic
The institute's Post-Graduate Diploma in Management (PGDM) is a full-time, two-year academic programme that starts in June and runs until April of the second year. The program includes courses in accounting, finance, economics, human resource management, marketing, business operations, public policy, strategy and general management.

Rankings
The institute has received an "A" grade rating at State Level and B** at National Level by CARE Ratings. (CREDIT ANALYSIS AND RESEARCH LIMITED). 
SKIPS is Ranked in Top 20 B-Schools for Excellent Faculty 2015 by Higher Education Review
Appealing to the EW-IMRB International Survey St. Kabir School got ranked First in Western Region and Fifth in India among the Schools in India.

Sports and athletics
The institute regularly observes sports days which fall normally in October–December involving both indoor and outdoor sports. Indoor sports include activities like arm wrestling, treasure hunts, indoor cricket, table tennis, chess, carrom and maldaddi.  Outdoor sports include kho kho, cricket, track and field events, volleyball, basketball and tug-of-war.

References

External links
 

Business schools in Gujarat
Universities and colleges in Ahmedabad
Educational institutions established in 2008
2008 establishments in Gujarat